Friends and Family or Friends & Family may refer to:

Film and television
 Friends & Family (film), a 2001 American gay-themed comedy film
 "Friends and Family" (Burn Notice), a television episode
 "Friends & Family" (Schitt's Creek), a television episode
 "Friends and Family" (The Simpsons), a television episode
 “Friends and Family”, an episode of The Good Doctor

Music
 Two compilation albums by Suicidal Tendencies and associated acts:
 Friends & Family, Vol. 1, 1997
 Friends & Family, Vol. 2, 2001
 Friends and Family, an EP by Montgomery Gentry, 2012
 "Friends & Family" (song), by Nav, 2020
 "Friends and Family", a song by Trik Turner, 2002

See also
 Friends and Family Test, a UK NHS survey
 Family and Friends, a 1990 Australian TV soap opera
 Family & Friends, a 2011 album by Serengeti